Sidi Khaled is a town in Algeria. It is located in the province of Biskra, famous for its oasis and palms. The name of Sidi Khaled is related to the Islamic personality Khaled Ibn Sounan Elabsi.

Geography
Sidi Khaled is located in Biskra Province, 100km south-east of the city of Biskra. It covers 212.60 km² and has 38987 inhabitants (2008 census) with a density of 203.74 inhabitants per km². The French name of the city is Sidi Khaled. Nearby cities are:
 Arish Hamoula ~ 4 km
 Sidi Khaled Drissi Med ~ 6 km
 Chiaba ~ 6 km
 Difel ~ 10 km
 Besbes, Algeria ~ 10 km
 Ouled Djellal ~ 10 km
 Ferfad Ali ~ 15 km

History
It is the place of origin of Foughal beni
Sidi Khaled is the son of Abd Elghelil came from the region of Sakia El Hamra (Sahara Occidental) and settled in the region of Foughala beside Biskara; Then they settled on the coast, near Jijel and Guelma Setif to forming one of the largest tribes of North Africa.

In this town lies the Muslim holy man Sidi Khaled Ibn Sinan al Absi.

It is the city of the legendary Hizia (1855-1878) the eponymous poem sung by Mohamed Ben Guittoun Abdelhamid Ababsa and khelifi ahmed immortalized.

Economy 
Sidi Khaled is located in a semi-arid region on the border of the Sahara Desert, with most people engaged in agro-pastoral vocation.

External links

 Sidi Khaled web site

Oases of Algeria
Communes of Biskra Province
Cities in Algeria